Philipp Ehrenreich (born 15 July 1892, date of death unknown) was an Austrian athlete. He competed in the men's long jump at the 1912 Summer Olympics.

References

1892 births
Year of death missing
Athletes (track and field) at the 1912 Summer Olympics
Austrian male long jumpers
Olympic athletes of Austria
Place of birth missing